Dr. Know is an American punk band, which began as a Nardcore band from Oxnard, California. They are regarded as founding fathers of the so-called "Nardcore" punk movement.

History
The band was started by Kyle Toucher, Ismael Hernandez, and Robin Cartwright in early 1981, and after auditioning a few singers, local Silver Strand Beach surfer/skater Brandon Cruz got the job. Silver Strand Beach in Oxnard, California was the birthplace of Nardcore. The band recorded studio versions of several early songs with Cruz, however the early momentum was somewhat derailed by inner turmoil and it led to him leaving the group in 1983, leaving Toucher to take over vocals just as the band was starting recording of Plug In Jesus for Mystic Records. Several more albums followed, including the Burn EP, This Island Earth, and Wreckage in Flesh, which were subsequently released on Death Records/Metal Blade, signaling a shift to a crossover direction in their sound. For This Island Earth, their best album to date the lineup was founding member Kyle Toucher on vocals and guitars, drummer Rik Heller and bassist Ismael's Hernandez.
In the mid-1980s, Kyle Toucher and the boys recorded a demo tape in the Camarillo CA, Televents Studios with Gene McDole ("KUATO" of International Freedom Foundation and Union Of Three percenter American Patriots fame) as Executive Producer and successfully earned the band a new label. (check the liner notes on "This Island Earth").

Before an American tour for This Island Earth with Scottish street punks The Exploited, Ismael Hernandez quit the band and was replaced by ex-Stäläg 13 members, bassist Tony Black and second guitarist Tim Harkins.

After another short U.S. tour and attempt at writing a new album, Rick Heller quit the band before moving to Scotland, where he joined The Exploited and drummer Larry White was brought in to finish writing and begin recording of what would become Wreckage in Flesh. During this period Tony Black was replaced by Mike Purdy and the album was finished April 1988. Two subsequent tours followed in support of the album with bands such as The Circle Jerks, D.R.I., Murphy's Law, 7 Seconds as well as shows with up and coming thrash metal bands Forbidden, Vio-lence, Holy Terror, and Metal Church.

Dr. Know disbanded to pursue other projects in 1991. Since that time Slayer covered the Toucher penned "Mr. Freeze" on their Undisputed Attitude album.

The Dr. Know song "Piece of Meat," written by Toucher and Cruz, is used on the 1998 (season two) South Park episode entitled "Clubhouse."

In 1998, Cruz called Hernandez and together they approached Toucher. Toucher declined, but Hernandez and Cruz recruited others and embarked on a North American tour with big-name punk acts of the time.

In September 2001, Cruz was asked to sing with old friends, the reunited Dead Kennedys, leading to a gig that lasted until April 2003. Dr. Know still managed another record, entitled Father, Son, and Holy Shit! and toured the West Coast with Stäläg 13 and Ill Repute.

Dr. Know released their last record in 2009, on Unrest Records, entitled "Killing For God." Cruz, Hernandez, and the Contreras cousins, Rick and Steve, all wrote the record, recorded in Santa Cruz, California.

May 2010, Dr. Know with Hernandez and Cruz played a final gig. This version of the band played 2 more special gigs in Santa Cruz, Ca., and in Oakland, November 25 and 26, 2011.
 
Founding member, and the 6th and 8th vocalist and songwriter Kyle Toucher, now works as a visual effects and digital artist in Los Angeles, CA. He has done work on TV series such as Battlestar Galactica and Star Trek: Voyager as well as in movies such as Serenity and Van Helsing. Toucher has won two Emmys for his work.

On August 18, 2010, Brandon Cruz posted the official end of his and Hernandez' version of Dr Know.

The same day that Brandon Cruz announced the breakup of the punk Dr. Know, Kyle Toucher announced the reformation of the Wreckage in Flesh era line up. Called The Real Dr. Know featuring Kyle Toucher, the lineup is Toucher, Mike Purdy, Tim Harkins, and Steve "El Steevo" Morrison. As of late 2011, the Toucher-led Dr. Know has reformed and have played a few successful West Coast gigs.

Brandon Cruz is still playing punk rock and is also a photographer, and recovery consultant.

Dr. Know gave birth to KNOW, in November 2016. Known as KNOW, ex members of the band playing the punk music of Dr. Know, began rehearsing with Cruz, Hernandez, Larry White, ex drummer from the metal era, and Fred Mattaquin, the 2nd guitarist on the Burn ep.
KNOW planned to go to Europe with Stäläg 13 to begin the Nardcore Summer Tour on July 22, 2017. It was to start off with a festival in Copenhagen with Discharge.

Brandon, Ismael, Fred Mattaquin, and Larry White, all ex-original members, are now playing as DR. KNOW, as of 2018. An appearance at Punk Rock Bowling is happening September 24, and 26th. Then a tour with the duo The Garden of the East Coat and Southwest is happening in November. Dr. Know are planning a European tour in 2022 with old friends Million of Dead Cops. as well as Russia, North Korea, China, Australia, Indonesia, and Japan.

Discography
 We Got Power, Party or Go Home - Compilation LP (Mystic,1983)
 It Came From Slimy Valley, Compilation LP (Mystic, 1983)
 Party Animal, We Got Power II - Compilation LP (Mystic,1984)
 Covers, Compilation LP (Mystic,1984)
 Mystic Super Seven Sampler No. 1, Compilation LP (Mystic,1984)
 Mystic Sampler No. 1, Compilation LP (Mystic)
 Mystic Sampler No. 2, Compilation LP (Mystic)
 Mystic Sampler No. 3, Compilation LP (Mystic)
 Nardcore, Compilation LP (Mystic, 1984)
 Return to Slimy Valley, Compilation LP (Mystic)
 Plug-in Jesus, 12-inch LP (Mystic, 1984)
 Burn, 7-inch EP (Mystic, 1985)
 This Island Earth, 12-inch LP (Death Records, 1986)
 The Original Group, 12-inch LP  (Mystic, 1987) This was actually the first recording, done with Brandon Cruz in 1981.
 Wreckage in Flesh, 12-inch LP (Death Records, 1988)
 This Island Earth/Wreckage In Flesh, CD (Death Records, 1990)
 Father, Son, and Holy Shit, LP ( recorded in 2000)
 Habily: What Was Old Is New, CD (Cleopatra, 2001)
 Fish & Vegetables, Compilation CD (Hello Records, 2001)
 Best of Dr. Know, CD (Mystic, 2003)
 Welcome to the Neighborhood, Compilation CD (Let Them Eat Records, 2005)
 Killing For God, CD /Vinyl LP (Unrest, 2008)

References

Hardcore punk groups from California
Crossover thrash groups
Musical groups from Ventura County, California
Musical groups established in 1981
Musicians from Oxnard, California